Q-Factor is a non-profit organization based in Denmark.  The focus is on the promotion of LGBT (lesbian, gay, bisexual, and transgender) equality through business as well as within the workplace. The influence is typically within the European markets but not exclusively.  Through partnerships with other non-profit organizations as well as corporations, Q-Factor promotes equality via different mediums ranging from independent research projects to local trainings to cooperative planning of international conferences.  Q-Factor is continually looking for new ways to increase LGBT equality and inclusion through business.

Q-Factor was founded by Becky Strohmer and Pernille Steckhahn in October 2010.

References

External links 
Q-Factor homepage

LGBT organizations in Denmark